Thomas Frederick Outridge Brimage (23 July 1866 – 25 May 1915) was an Australian businessman and politician who served as a member of the Legislative Council of Western Australia from 1900 to 1912. He was prominent in mining circles on the Eastern Goldfields before entering politics.

Early life
Brimage was born in Ratcliff, London, England, to Emma (née Atkinson) and Thomas Brimage. He moved to Port Pirie, South Australia, as a small child, where his father became the harbour master. After leaving school, Brimage completed an engineering apprenticeship with South Australian Railways, and was then employed as a mechanical draughtsman. He moved to Western Australia in 1894, during the gold rush, and initially set up as a consulting engineer in Coolgardie. Brimage later moved to Kalgoorlie and established himself as a land agent and sharebroker. He became general manager of one major mine and a consulting engineer on several smaller ones, and also pegged out several mining claims of his own.

Politics and later life
In 1896, Brimage was elected to the East Coolgardie Road Board (renamed the Kalgoorlie Road Board in 1897). He served until 1899, including as chairman for a period. Brimage entered parliament at the 1900 Legislative Council election, winning a six-year term as one of three members for the new South Province. He transferred to North-East Province at the 1906 election, but was defeated in his bid for re-election in 1912, losing to Hal Colebatch (a future premier) in East Province. After leaving politics, Brimage worked as a hotelkeeper, living for periods in Kojonup, Katanning, Northam, and Narrogin. He died in Narrogin in May 1915, aged 48, after a long illness. He had married Marie Louise Reynolds in 1896, with whom he had four children.

See also
 Members of the Western Australian Legislative Council

References

1866 births
1915 deaths
Australian mining engineers
Australian mining entrepreneurs
English emigrants to Australia
Mayors of places in Western Australia
Members of the Western Australian Legislative Council
People from Stepney
19th-century Australian engineers
20th-century Australian engineers
19th-century Australian businesspeople
Western Australian local councillors